Szukała is a surname of Polish language origin, derived from  the verb Szukać (to search), "the one who searches". Notable people with this surname include:

Łukasz Szukała (born 1984), polish footballer
Rafał Szukała (born 1971), Polish butterfly swimmer
Stan Szukala (1918-2003), American basketball player

See also

Polish-language surnames